Public Knowledge is a non-profit Washington, D.C.-based public interest group. Founded in 2001 by David Bollier and Gigi Sohn, Public Knowledge is primarily involved in the fields of intellectual property law, competition and choice in the digital marketplace, and an open standards/end-to-end internet.

History
Public Knowledge was founded by David Bollier and Gigi Sohn.  Chris Lewis is president and CEO, and its directors include Internet Archive Director and Co-founder Brewster Kahle, University of Pennsylvania professor Kevin Werbach, and former FCC Commissioner Michael J. Copps.
Public Knowledge's work focuses on the three 'IP's of communications and copyright policy: information policy, intellectual property, and Internet Protocol.

The group is known for its advocacy for copyright defenses and exemptions such as fair use and against the expansion of copyright in general. For instance, in response to the FCC's attempt to mandate a broadcast flag for all digital TV tuners, Public Knowledge led the successful legal campaign to have the rule overturned.  One study of the politics of digital rights management policy concluded, "Since its 2001 founding, Public Knowledge has risen to prominence as the pre-eminent DC-based policy advocacy organization within the strong fair use coalition."

Board of directors
The following individuals are on the board as of February 2020.
Virginia Lam Abrams - Senior Vice President of Starry, Inc., operators of Starry Internet
Moses Boyd - Founding Partner, Integrated Solutions Group
Michael J. Copps - Former FCC Commissioner, Special Adviser to the Media and Democracy Reform Initiative at Common Cause
Maura Colleton Corbett -  President and Founder of Glen Echo Group
Laurent Crenshaw - Senior Director of Policy, Eaze
Brewster Kahle - Internet Archive, Digital Librarian, Director and Co-founder
Andrew McLaughlin - Partner, betaworks; Co-founder and Partner, Higher Ground Labs
Michael Petricone - Senior Vice President Government Affairs, Consumer Technology Association
Frank C. Torres, III - Director of Consumer Affairs and Senior Policy Counsel, Microsoft
Kevin Werbach - Professor at the Wharton School, University of Pennsylvania

Former members of the board 
Hal Abelson - Professor of Computer Science and Engineering, Massachusetts Institute of Technology
Leah Belsky - Vice President of Strategic Development and Associate General Counsel, Kaltura
David Bollier - Writer and founder of the Commons Strategies Group
Hal Bringman - Founder and President of NVPR
Susan Crawford - Professor, University of Michigan Law School
Jesse Dylan - Founder, Wondros
Lawrence Lessig - Professor of Law, Stanford Law School
Warrington Hudlin - Founder, dvRepublic
Reed Hundt - Former Chair, Federal Communications Commission (FCC)
Joichi Ito - Former Director,  MIT Media Lab
Laurie Racine - Founder, Managing Director, Startl
Gigi B. Sohn - Founder of Public Knowledge; Counselor to former FCC Chairman Tom Wheeler
Jonathan Taplin - Adjunct Professor, USC Annenberg School for Communication and Journalism
Kathleen Wallman - President, Wallman Consulting LLC

See also
Copyleft
Creative Commons
Digital rights
Fair use
Free culture movement
Net neutrality law

References

External links
Public Knowledge

Intellectual property activism
Intellectual property organizations
Political advocacy groups in the United States
Non-profit organizations based in Washington, D.C.
501(c)(3) organizations